Department of Health Services may refer to:

Arizona Department of Health Services
 Los Angeles County Department of Health Services
 The California Department of Health Services, superseded by the California Health and Human Services Agency
Wisconsin Department of Health Services